was a general of the Imperial Japanese Army, and commander-in-chief of the China Expeditionary Army from November 1944 to the end of World War II. He was tried but found not guilty of any war crimes by the Shanghai War Crimes Tribunal after the war. As one of the Imperial Japanese Army's top China experts, General Okamura spent his entire military career on the Asian mainland.

Biography

Early life
Born in Tokyo in 1884, Okamura enrolled in Sakamachi Elementary School and graduated eight years later. In 1897, he entered Waseda Junior High School. In 1898, he was transferred to Tokyo Junior Army School, and was transferred to Army Central Junior School later. Okamura entered the 16th class of the Imperial Japanese Army Academy in 1899 and graduated in 1904. His classmates included the future generals Itagaki Seishiro, Kenji Doihara and Ando Rikichi. He was commissioned a second lieutenant in the IJA 1st Infantry Regiment. In 1907, he was promoted to lieutenant and was assigned to the Army Academy to assist with the training of cadets from China.

In 1910, Okamura entered the 25th class of the Army War College, and was promoted to captain soon after graduation in 1913. He served in a number of staff positions on the Imperial Japanese Army General Staff during and after World War I including an assignment to Beijing in June 1914. From June to December 1921, he was sent as a military attache to the United States and Europe. While at Baden-Baden in Germany, he met with Tetsuzan Nagata, Toshiro Obata and Hideki Tojo, laying the foundation for the Tōseiha political clique within the Japanese Army. On his return to Japan, he was assigned to the 14th Infantry Regiment.

He was assigned to China in 1923, and served as a military advisor to Chinese warlord general Sun Chuanfang, in this capacity, he gathered many vital information and war maps, which later were used in the military operations of the Second Sino-Japanese War. He was promoted to colonel in July 1927 and returned to Japan to command the IJA 6th Infantry Regiment.

From August 1929, Okamura was appointed as Assistant Director of Human Resources Bureau in the Ministry of the Army. He was involved in the March incident, a failed coup d'etat attempt to establish a military dictatorship headed by General Kazushige Ugaki , but received no punishment.

On May 31, the same year, he reached the conclusion of the Heiwa and Tanggu Agreement, which was the plenipotentiary of the National Government Army.

From 1932 to 1933, Okamura was Deputy chief-of-staff of the Shanghai Expeditionary Army under the aegis of the Kwantung Army. According to Okamura's own memoirs, he played a role in the recruitment of comfort women from Nagasaki prefecture to serve in military brothels in Shanghai. 

He served as military attaché to Manchukuo from 1933 to 1934, and played a role in the negotiations for the Tanggu Truce between Japan and China.

Okamura was promoted to lieutenant general in 1936, and assigned command of the IJA 2nd Division.

Second Sino-Japanese War
In 1938, a year after the Marco Polo Bridge Incident, Okamura was assigned as the commander in chief of the Japanese Eleventh Army, which participated in numerous major engagements in the Second Sino-Japanese War, notably the Battles of Wuhan, Nanchang and Changsha. According to historians Yoshiaki Yoshimi and Seiya Matsuno, Okamura was authorized by Emperor Hirohito to use chemical weapons during those battles. 

In April 1940, Okamura was promoted to the rank of full general. In July 1941, he was appointed the commander-in-chief of the Northern China Area Army. In December 1941, Okamura received Imperial General Headquarters Order Number 575 authorizing the implementation of the Three Alls Policy in north China, aimed primarily at breaking the Chinese Red Army. According to historian Mitsuyoshi Himeta, the scorched earth campaign was responsible for the deaths of "more than 2.7 million" Chinese civilians.

In 1944, Okamura was overall commander of the massive and largely successful Operation Ichigo against airfields in southern China, while retaining personal command of the Japanese Sixth Area Army. A few months later, he was appointed the commander-in-chief of the China Expeditionary Army. As late as January 1945, Okamura was still confident of the victory of Japan in China.

With the surrender of Japan on 15 August 1945, Okamura represented the Imperial Japanese Army in the China Burma India Theater official surrender ceremony held at Nanjing on 9 September 1945. The Chinese representatives at the surrender was General He Yingqin, who ironically was Okamura's opposite during the Tanggu Truce negotiations.

Post-war life 
After the war, Okamura was found not guilty of any war crimes in January 1949 by the Shanghai War Crimes Tribunal. Nationalist leader Chiang Kai-shek then retained him as a military adviser for the Nationalist Government. 
  
While he was questioned by the investigators, he testified about the Nanking massacre:
 "I surmised the following based on what I heard from Staff Officer Miyazaki, CCAA Special Service Department Chief Harada and Hangzhou Special Service Department Chief Hagiwara a day or two after I arrived in Shanghai. First, it is true that tens of thousands of acts of violence, such as looting and rape, took place against civilians during the assault on Nanking. Second, front-line troops indulged in the evil practice of executing POWs on the pretext of (lacking) rations."

The Nationalist regime of Chiang Kai-Shek intervened to protect Okamura from repeated American requests that he testify at the Tokyo war crimes trial.

Okamura remained as an advisor to the Nationalist government until he was decommissioned in January 1949 and returned to Japan. He was active in the post-war era as advisor to the National Bereaved Family Support Association and also formed a group of retired military officers with Chinese experience called the "Paidan", which continued to provide informal support for the Chinese Nationalist government until his death in 1966.

References

External links

Notes

 

1884 births
1966 deaths
People from Tokyo
Japanese military attachés
Japanese generals
Japanese military personnel of World War II
Grand Cordons of the Order of the Rising Sun
Recipients of the Order of the Sacred Treasure, 1st class
Recipients of the Order of the Golden Kite, 1st class